In Norse mythology, Þrymr (Thrymr, Thrym; "uproar") was king of the jǫtnar. In one legend, he stole Mjǫlnir, Thor's hammer, to extort the gods into giving him Freyja as his wife. His realm was called Jötunheimr, but according to Hversu Noregr byggðist, it was the Swedish province Värmland, then a part of Norway.

Þrymr was foiled in his scheme by the gracefulness of Heimdallr, the cunning of Loki, and the sheer violence of Thor, who later killed Þrymr, his sister, and all of the jotnar kin that had been present at the wedding reception. The poem Þrymskviða gives the details of how Thor got his hammer back. Bergfinnr is a son of Þrymr.

Thor arrived riding on his chariot, dressed in a wedding gown in order to pretend to be Freya, who refused to marry Þrymr. Thor managed to kill all of the Earth Giants including Þrymr when he made his escape the moment he took hold of Mjǫlnir again.

Kings in Norse mythology and legends
Jötnar